Juan Jesús Gutiérrez Cuevas (born 26 June 1969 in Reinosa, Cantabria) is a Spanish cross-country skier who competed from 1991 to 2006. His best World Cup finish was third at a marathon event in France in 2000.

Gutiérrez also competed in five Winter Olympics, earning his best finish of 17th in the 30 km event at Salt Lake City in 2002. His best finish at the FIS Nordic World Ski Championships was sixth in the 50 km event at Thunder Bay in 1995.

References
FIS-Ski.com profile

1969 births
Living people
People from Reinosa
Cross-country skiers from Cantabria
Spanish male cross-country skiers
Cross-country skiers at the 1992 Winter Olympics
Cross-country skiers at the 1994 Winter Olympics
Cross-country skiers at the 1998 Winter Olympics
Cross-country skiers at the 2002 Winter Olympics
Cross-country skiers at the 2006 Winter Olympics
Olympic cross-country skiers of Spain